Benowo Station is a railway station located in Benowo, Pakal, Surabaya, East Java, Indonesia. This over three metre height station is controlled by Control Area VIII Surabaya. There are a soccer stadium not far from this station which is Gelora Bung Tomo Stadium.

Services
The following is a list of train services at the Benowo Station

Passenger services
 Commuter
 Local economy

References

Railway stations in Surabaya